Marco Mourmada (born December 12, 1976 in N'Djamena) is a Chadian footballer who previously played as a midfielder for PSMS Medan and the Chad national football team.

References

1976 births
Association football midfielders
Living people
Chadian footballers
Chadian expatriate footballers
Chad international footballers
Chadian expatriate sportspeople in Indonesia
Gazelle FC players
Mpumalanga Black Aces F.C. players
Medan Jaya players
PSPS Pekanbaru players
PSMS Medan players
Sun Hei SC players
Pelita Jaya FC players
Expatriate soccer players in South Africa
Expatriate footballers in Indonesia
Expatriate footballers in Hong Kong
National First Division players
Indonesian Premier Division players
Hong Kong First Division League players
People from N'Djamena